was a feudal domain under the Tokugawa shogunate of Edo period Japan, in what is now western Ehime Prefecture on the island of Shikoku. It was centered around Niiya jin'ya in what is now part of the city of Ōzu, Ehime , and was ruled throughout its history by a cadet branch of tozama daimyō Katō clan. Niiya Domain was dissolved in the abolition of the han system in 1871 and is now part of Ehime Prefecture.

History
In 1617, Ōzu Domain was assigned to Katō Sadayasu from Yonago Domain, with a kokudaka to 66,000 koku. Sadayasu died suddenly in 1623 without formally having appointed a successor, which would normally be cause for attainder; however, his eldest son Katō Yasuaki managed to secure an audience with Shogun Tokugawa Hidetada and was accepted as heir. However, the shogunate also "informally" recognized his younger brother, Katō Naoyasu, as daimyō of  his own 10,000 koku estate and to establish Niiya Domain and a cadet brach of the Katō clan. This move was made without the prior knowledge of Katō Yasuaki and was thus vehemently opposed by Ōzu Domain, and relations between the two branches of the clan was hostile for the next two centuries. Niiya Domain was left in the ambitious position of both being a subsidiary domain of Ōzu and a direct domain under the shogunate. The jin'ya was completed in 1642. The history of the domain was relatively uneventful. The noted Confucian scholar Nakae Tōju spent part of his early career in Niiya. In the latter half of the Edo period, the domain's finances were in serious trouble due to flooding and fires caused by the flooding of the Hiji River. During the Boshin War, the domain fielded a company of commoner riflemen in the pro-imperial army, but otherwise played no role. With the 1871 abolition of the han system Ōzu Domain became "Ōzu Prefecture" and merged with "Uwajima Prefecture" before becoming part of Ehime Prefecture. The Kato clan was awarded the title of viscount user the kazoku peerage system in 1884.

A building of former jin'ya of the domain survives, and is designated a Ehime Prefectural Tangible Cultural Property. It is located within the grounds of the Ozu Municipal Niiya Elementary School.

Holdings at the end of the Edo period
As with most domains in the han system, Niiya Domain consisted of several discontinuous territories calculated to provide the assigned kokudaka, based on periodic cadastral surveys and projected agricultural yields. 

Iyo Province  
8 villages in Ukena District
3 villages in Iyo District
3 villages in Kita District

List of daimyō 

{| class=wikitable
! #||Name || Tenure || Courtesy title || Court Rank || kokudaka  
|-
|colspan=6|  Katō clan, 1623-1871 (Tozama)
|-
||1||||1623 1682||Oribe-no-kami (織部正)|| Junior 5th Rank, Lower Grade (従五位下)||10,000 koku  
|-
||2||||1682 - 1716||Izumo-no-kami (出雲守)|| Junior 5th Rank, Lower Grade (従五位下)||10,000 koku   
|-
||3||||1716 - 1727||Ōkura-no-Shōyū (大蔵少輔)|| Junior 5th Rank, Lower Grade (従五位下)||10,000 koku  
|-
|4||||1727 - 1756||Oribe-no-kami (織部正)|| Junior 5th Rank, Lower Grade (従五位下)||10,000 koku   
|-
||5||||1756 - 1771||Ōmi-no-kami (近江守)|| Junior 5th Rank, Lower Grade (従五位下)||10,000 koku    
|-
||6||||1771 - 1810||Izumo-no-kami (出雲守)|| Junior 5th Rank, Lower Grade (従五位下)||10,000 koku   
|-
||7||||1810 - 1831||Yamashiro-no-kami (山城守)|| Junior 5th Rank, Lower Grade (従五位下)||10,000 koku    
|-
||8||||1831 - 1862||'Ōkura-no-Shōyū (大蔵少輔)|| Junior 5th Rank, Lower Grade (従五位下)||10,000 koku  
|-
||9||||1862 - 1871||Izumo-no-kami (出雲守)|| Junior 5th Rank, Lower Grade (従五位下)||10,000 koku''   
||-
|}

See also
 List of Han
 Abolition of the han system

References

External links

Ozu city official home page 

Domains of Japan
History of Ehime Prefecture
Iyo Province
Shikoku region
1623 establishments in Japan
States and territories established in 1623
1871 disestablishments in Japan
States and territories disestablished in 1871